Gurdial Singh (born 1 January 1924) is an Indian mountaineer who led the first mountaineering expedition of independent India to Trisul (7,120 metres) in 1951. In 1958, he led the team that made the first ascent of Mrigthuni (6,855 metres).
 In 1965, he was a member of the first successful Indian expedition team to climb Mount Everest.

Singh also led many expeditions at The Doon School, where he was a teacher, and along with other Doon masters and students was instrumental in establishing a mountaineering culture in post-Independence India. Singh has been described as "the first true Indian mountaineer", and in 2020, the Himalayan Journal noted "Gurdial climbed for pleasure, to enjoy the mountains in the company of friends, to savour the beauty and grandeur of the high ranges, not to find fame or bag summits."

Life and career

Gurdial Singh joined The Doon School in 1945 and it was here that he was influenced by Englishmen such as John Martyn, R.L. Holdsworth and Jack Gibson to take up mountaineering. The first headmaster of Doon Arthur Foot was a member of the Alpine Club. Together, they scaled many peaks including Bandarpunch, Trisul, Kamet, Abi Gamin and Nanda Devi. He was the first Indian member of the famed Alpine Club, which was "a club of English gentlemen devoted to mountaineering". In 1965, Singh climbed Mount Everest as a member of the first successful Indian expedition, led by Mohan Singh Kohli.

Awards
Apart from being the first Indian to be included in the Alpine Club, Singh was given the Arjuna Award in 1965 for his contributions towards Indian mountaineering. In 1967, Singh was awarded Padma Shri., the fourth highest civilian award in India. In 2007, Gurdial Singh was given a Lifetime Achievement Award and the Tenzing Norgay National Adventure Award for his contributions towards Indian mountaineering.

See also
Role of The Doon School in Indian mountaineering

References
Notes

Bibliography
For Hills to Climb by Gurdial Singh, Nandu JayalPublished by Doon School Old Boys' Society, 2001.
An Indian Englishman by Jack Gibson 2008 

Recipients of the Padma Shri in sports
The Doon School faculty
Mountain climbers from Uttarakhand
1924 births
Living people
Indian mountain climbers
People from Uttarkashi
Recipients of the Tenzing Norgay National Adventure Award
Recipients of the Arjuna Award